Victor Nicholas 'Vic' Jude (March 11, 1923 – August 15, 1994) was an American businessman and politician. He ran a small business specializing in candy and tobacco products.

Victor was born in Maple Lake, Minnesota. He went to the Maple Lake public schools. He served in the United States Army during World War II. Victor went to the University of St. Thomas in Saint Paul, Minnesota, to the University of Minnesota, and the Minnesota College of Law. He owned and operated Jude Candy and Tobacco Company, which has since been renamed Jude Vending. Victor served in the Minnesota House of Representatives from 1957 to 1966 and in the Minnesota Senate from 1967 to 1972. He was a Democrat. Victor died from stomach cancer at a hospital in St. Cloud, Minnesota. His son Tad Jude also served in the Minnesota Legislature, and his brother, doctor James Jude, was one of the developers of cardiopulmonary resuscitation (CPR). Tad Jude is a current candidate in the 2022 Minnesota Attorney General election.

Notes

External links

1923 births
1994 deaths
People from Maple Lake, Minnesota
Military personnel from Minnesota
Businesspeople from Minnesota
University of St. Thomas (Minnesota) alumni
University of Minnesota alumni
Democratic Party members of the Minnesota House of Representatives
Democratic Party Minnesota state senators
Deaths from cancer in Minnesota
Deaths from stomach cancer
20th-century American politicians
20th-century American businesspeople